Electoral reform in Washington may refer to:

 Electoral reform in Washington (state)
 Electoral reform in Washington, D.C.